Josephine Effah-Chukwuma (born 29 September 1966) is a Nigerian development specialist and advocate against domestic violence who founded Sophia's Place, the first battered women's shelter in Nigeria  She is the founder and executive director of Project Alert established in January, 1999 which provides medical assistance to injured female victims through public fund sourcing and also provide legal services to victims.

Background and education 
Effah-Chukwuma is an English and Literature graduate from the University of Calabar  with a master's degree in Development Studies with Specialization in women from the Institute of Social Studies in The Hague, Netherlands. She was born into a family of 7 and married to Barr. Innocent Chukwuma.

Career 
She worked for a newspaper called The Diplomat until 1992 when she went for her master's degree after which she joined The Constitutional Rights Project, an institution founded by Clement Nwankwo.

She has saved a lot of women through her NGO Project Alert. In May 2001, she launched a shelter project known as Sophia's place (the first battered women's shelter in Nigeria) – a temporary shelter for victims of domestic violence. For eight years, the shelter operated in a rented building.

In 2010, Project Alert was able to acquire its own building for its shelter project through funds raised at the Ngo's 10th Anniversary Shelter Fundraising event in 2009 and funds received from the African Women Foundation, AWDF, Accra Ghana.

She is a member of several organizations which include Lead Consultant at Justice for all (J4A) Programme 1.4 Voluntary Policing, President at Our Lady of Apostle Old Students Association, Founding Member at Association on Research in Civil Society in Africa, AROCSA and also an Ashoka fellow since 2002.

References 

Nigerian chief executives
Nigerian women in business
Nigerian social entrepreneurs
Igbo people
Living people
1966 births
Ashoka Fellows